The 2008–09 Texas Tech Red Raiders men's basketball team represented Texas Tech University during the 2008–09 NCAA Division I men's basketball season. The team plays in the Big 12 Conference at the United Spirit Arena in Lubbock, Texas. The season marked Pat Knight's first full season as head coach.

Preseason

Personnel changes
Pat Knight took over the head coaching duties late in the 2007–08 season after Bob Knight resigned on February 4, 2008. This was Pat's first full season as head coach of the Red Raiders. Pat hired Bubba Jennings as an assistant coach in addition to Chris Beard and Stew Robinson.

Recruiting

 In January 2009, Tyree Graham announced he would be leaving the team, citing family reasons.

Schedule

|-
!colspan=8| Big 12 tournament

Source for regular season
Source for Big 12 Tournament

Notable games and events

East Central
In the third game of the season, Texas Tech defeated Division II opponent East Central 167–115, setting a new school record for most points scored in a game. The previous record of 128 was set in the double overtime victory over Texas on February 20, 1994. The combined total of 282 points also became a new record.

Wichita State
Texas Tech led the Wichita State Shockers 43–26 going into halftime. The lead quickly deteriorated as Wichita State went on a 12–3 run to open the second half. The Shockers eventually tied the game with about 41 seconds remaining. Mike Singletary then hit a 3-pointer with 4.1 seconds left to give the Red Raiders the win, 72–69.

Nebraska
In a 69–82 loss to Nebraska, Knight ran onto the court to argue with officials after Texas Tech player Alan Voskuil was called for a foul. After receiving two technical fouls, Knight was ejected from the game. Once in the tunnel, Knight ran back onto the court to continue arguing. Knight was not suspended, rather receiving a public reprimand from the Big 12 Conference.

Texas
The Red Raiders were without head coach Pat Knight against Texas after he was suspended for criticizing the officials in a game four days earlier against Texas A&M.

Kansas
Texas Tech upset #9 Kansas 84–65 at home on senior night. Senior Alan Voskuil had a career high 35 points, going 9–14 from 3-point range and 10–17 overall. It was Kansas' worst defeat of the season and marked their third straight loss at the United Spirit Arena.

Big 12 Tournament
The only chance the Red Raiders had at making the postseason was to win the Big 12 tournament where the winner receives an automatic bid in the NCAA tournament. Texas Tech went into the tournament as the #11 seed after losing to Iowa State 76–78 in the last game of the regular season, thus giving Iowa State the #10 seed.

Texas A&M
Texas A&M took a 29–48 lead into halftime and built it up to 21 early in the second half. In the second half, sophomore Mike Singletary scored 29 points in a row to help Texas Tech take a 79–78 lead with 39.4 seconds left in the game and eventually win 88–83. Singletary finished the game with 43 points, a career high and Big 12 tournament record for most points in a single game. Mike Singletary's 29 consecutive points is the second longest streak in NCAA history and Texas Tech's comeback from 21 points down is a Big 12 Tournament record.

Missouri
Texas Tech was able to manage a 31–31 halftime tie against #3 seed Missouri. In the second half, however, Missouri's full-court press defense allowed the Tigers to go on a 13 point run early in the second half. Mike Singletary led Texas Tech with 17 points and Missouri's DeMarre Carroll had 19 to help Missouri win 81–60.

Awards and honors
Esmir Rizvic
Academic All-Big 12 First Team

John Roberson
All-Big 12 Honorable Mention
USBWA All-District 7 Team

Mike Singletary
Academic All-Big 12 Second Team
Big 12 Championship All-Tournament Team

Alan Voskuil
All-Big 12 Honorable Mention

See also
2008–09 Big 12 Conference men's basketball season

References

Texas Tech
Texas Tech Red Raiders basketball seasons
Texas Tech
Texas Tech